William Blake Robbins (born June 17, 1965) is an American actor and director of film and television. He appeared in the films Wind River, The Ugly Truth, Jayhawkers, and To Leslie. Robbins is also known for his guest-starring appearances as Officer Dave Brass on the HBO drama series Oz, Tom Halpert on the NBC sitcom The Office, and Mitch Glender on the FX crime drama series Sons of Anarchy, as well as supporting roles in Firefly, Law & Order, 24, Entourage, and The Bling Ring.
 
After almost two decades working as an actor, Robbins stepped behind the camera and made his directorial debut with the independent drama The Sublime and Beautiful, which premiered at the Slamdance Film Festival. His second feature as director, the modern-day western The Scent of Rain and Lightning starring Maika Monroe, received critical acclaim.

Early life
Robbins was born in Karamürsel, Turkey, where his father served in the United States Navy. Robbins has one brother. His parents divorced when he was little and his mother remarried. Robbins had a strong connection with his stepfather, who passed away in April 2013. Robbins's biological father along with his brother struggled with alcoholism. After earning a degree in Business Marketing, Robbins attended the American Academy of Dramatic Arts in New York City. Soon after, he began to perform on Broadway, working also as an acting coach for a while. Robbins currently resides in Los Angeles.

Career
Robbins began his career in 1996 with a guest appearance in an episode of the ABC soap opera All My Children. He went on to guest star in television series such as Law & Order, Third Watch and Firefly, before landing a recurring role as Officer Dave Brass in the HBO drama Oz between 2001 and 2003. During the 2000s, Robbins continued acting on the series Charmed, Strong Medicine, Medium, Crossing Jordan, The O.C., 24, Without a Trace, Criminal Minds and Private Practice. Robbins also appeared as Tom Halpert on the NBC's comedy The Office, opposite Steve Carell and John Krasinski.
 
Robbins' first film role was in the independent drama Going Under. Since then, he appeared in other numerous other features including Love Comes to the Executioner, Bunker Hill, and the romantic comedy The Ugly Truth, in which he stars alongside Katherine Heigl and Gerard Butler.

Throughout the 2010s, Robbins guest-starred in several television series including FlashForward, The Closer, Rizzoli & Isles, CSI: NY, Sons of Anarchy, Masters of Sex and Legends. Simultaneously, Robbins worked on a number of independent films, namely Rubber, Jayhawkers, Martyrs and Wind River. More recently, he starred in the Marcel Sarmiento horror thriller Faceless.
 
Robbins made his directorial debut with the independent drama The Sublime and Beautiful, which he also wrote and stars in as David Conrad, a father who loses his children in a car accident. Shot in only 12 days on a budget of $30,000, the film premiered at the 2014 Slamdance Film Festival. Writing for Variety, film critic Ronnie Scheib stated that Robbins "brings nothing new to Hollywood's dead-children genre".
 
Robbins directed his second film, The Scent of Rain and Lightning, starring Maika Monroe. Based on the 2010 novel of the same name by Nancy Pickard, the story centers on Jody Linder (Monroe), a young woman who finds out the man responsible for murdering her parents has been released from prison. Having its world premiere at the Atlanta Film Festival, the film garnered a positive reception from critics; in his review for The Hollywood Reporter, Frank Scheck opined that it was "a well-acted, intelligent thriller".

Filmography

Film

Television

Awards and nominations

References

External links

1965 births
American male film actors
American male television actors
20th-century American male actors
21st-century American male actors
Living people